The 1955 World Table Tennis Championships – Corbillon Cup (women's team) was the 15th edition of the women's team championship. 

Romania won the gold medal after finishing top of the final group. Japan won the silver medal and England won the bronze medal.

Medalists

Final tables

Group 1

Group 2

Group 3

Final group

Decisive final group match

See also
List of World Table Tennis Championships medalists

References

-
1955 in women's table tennis